KBOS-FM (94.9 FM, "B95") is a commercial radio station located in Fresno, California, licensed to Tulare and broadcasting to the Fresno area.  KBOS-FM airs an urban-leaning rhythmic contemporary music format under ownership of iHeartMedia, Inc.  Its studios are located on Shaw Avenue in North Fresno, and the transmitter tower is atop Eshom Point.

History
KBOS-FM was originally KGEN-FM, sister station to AM 1370 KGEN. KGEN-FM was first licensed on December 6, 1965. KGEN-FM changed callsigns to KBOS on July 24, 1967. It changed callsigns again on February 1, 1992 to KBOS-FM.
KBOS signed on with its Top 40 format in 1971, but it wasn't until the 1980s that they would evolve into its current direction, and since then have enjoyed dominant ratings.  Their first transmitter location was in the Blue Ridge Mountains along with KJUG-FM 106.7 with an ERP around 1,500 watts with an HAAT of 2,650 feet. The station’s transmitter site moved to Eshom Point to be closer to Fresno and to be able to increase power to 16.5 kW ERP.

They are also one of two Rhythmic Top 40s covering Fresno, Kings, Madera, and Tulare counties; the other being Rhythmic rival KSEQ.

External links
KBOS official website

References

BOS-FM
Rhythmic contemporary radio stations in the United States
Radio stations established in 1965
1965 establishments in California
IHeartMedia radio stations